Charles J. Spencer, Jr. (born March 17, 1982) is a former American football offensive tackle. He was drafted by the Houston Texans in the third round of the 2006 NFL Draft. He played college football at Pittsburgh.

Spencer has also been a member of the Carolina Panthers, Jacksonville Jaguars, and the UFL's Florida Tuskers.

Professional career

Houston Texans
Two games into the 2006 season, Spencer suffered a broken leg and was out for the year. He missed the entire 2007 season due to this injury as well. He was released on July 22, 2008.

Carolina Panthers
A day after being waived by the Texans, Spencer was claimed off waivers by the Carolina Panthers. He was waived again on August 7, with Panthers head coach John Fox citing "conditioning and weight" as the reason.

Jacksonville Jaguars
On September 3, 2008, Spencer was signed by the Jacksonville Jaguars. The move came a day after Jaguars offensive tackle Richard Collier was shot and hospitalized with life-threatening injuries. Collier was placed on the reserve/non-football injury list to make room for Spencer on the roster. He was waived on December 21 without having played a game for the Jaguars.

Spencer was re-signed to a future contract by the Jaguars on January 12, 2009. However, he was released on April 29, 2009.

Florida Tuskers
On July 21, 2009, Spencer agreed to contract terms with the Florida Tuskers of the newly formed United Football League.

GSC
Charles is currently Vice President responsible for Membership of the prestigious Garage Sportsman's Club located in Katy, TX.

References

External links
Jacksonville Jaguars bio
Pittsburgh Panthers bio
Just Sports Stats

1982 births
Living people
Players of American football from New York (state)
American football offensive tackles
American football offensive guards
Pittsburgh Panthers football players
Houston Texans players
Carolina Panthers players
Jacksonville Jaguars players
Florida Tuskers players
Sportspeople from Poughkeepsie, New York